Portland is a census-designated place (CDP) located in and governed by Ouray County, Colorado, United States. The CDP is a part of the Montrose, CO Micropolitan Statistical Area. The population of the Portland CDP was 135 at the United States Census 2010. The Ridgway post office  serves the area.

Geography
Portland is located between Ridgway and Ouray.

Demographics

See also

 List of census-designated places in Colorado

References

External links

 Ouray County website

Census-designated places in Ouray County, Colorado
Census-designated places in Colorado